These are the late night Monday-Friday schedules on all three networks for each calendar season beginning September 1956. All times are Eastern and Pacific.

Talk shows are highlighted in yellow, local programming is white.

Schedule

Beginning in October, due to Steve Allen's commitment on his Sunday night NBC variety show, Ernie Kovacs became host of The Tonight Show on Mondays and Tuesdays.

Sources

Brooks & Marsh, The Complete Directory To Prime-Time Network TV Shows (3rd ed.), Ballantine, 1984
Castleman & Podrazik, The TV Schedule Book, McGraw-Hill Paperbacks, 1984
TV schedules, NEW YORK TIMES, September 1956-September 1957 (microfilm)

United States late night network television schedules
1956 in American television
1957 in American television